Leonardo Marin (born 23 February 2002) is an Italian professional rugby union player who primarily plays fly-half for Benetton of the United Rugby Championship. He has also represented Italy at international level, having made his test debut against France during the 2022 Six Nations Championship. Marin has previously played for clubs such as Mogliano in the past.

Professional career 
Marin signed for Benetton in July 2021 ahead of the 2021–22 United Rugby Championship.

In 2021 Marin was named in Italy U20s squad for annual Six Nations Under 20s Championship. On the 14 October 2021, he was selected by Alessandro Troncon to be part of an Italy A 28-man squad for the 2021 end-of-year rugby union internationals.

On the 13 January 2022, he was selected by Kieran Crowley to be part of an Italy 33-man squad for the 2022 Six Nations Championship. He made his debut against France.

References

External links 

2002 births
Living people
Italian rugby union players
Benetton Rugby players
Rugby union fly-halves
Rugby union centres
Mogliano Rugby players
Italy international rugby union players
Sportspeople from Venice